The theory of criminal justice is the branch of philosophy of law that deals with criminal justice and in particular punishment. The theory of criminal justice has deep connections to other areas of philosophy, such as political philosophy and ethics, as well as to criminal justice in practice.

Justice and criminal justice

Distinction from general justice
Typically, legal theorists and philosophers consider four distinct kinds of justice: corrective justice, distributive justice, procedural justice, and retributive justice. Corrective justice is the idea that liability rectifies the injustice one person inflicts upon another (found in modern day contract law). Distributive justice seeks to appropriately distribute pleasure and pain between the offender and the victim by punishing the offender. Procedural justice focuses on the fairness in the processes that punish criminals. Retributive justice is perhaps best captured by the phrase lex talionis (the principle of "an eye for an eye"), which traces back to the Code of Hammurabi. 

Criminal law generally falls under retributive justice, a theory of justice that considers proportionate punishment a morally acceptable response to crime. The principle of lex talionis received its most well known philosophical defense from Immanuel Kant. Criminal law is no longer considered a purely retributive undertaking; deterrence figures prominently in the justification of the practice and in the rules themselves.

See also
 Marginal deterrence

References

Legal ethics
Social philosophy
Criminal justice